Calvin R. King (born 1953)  is an American farm developer, and the President of the Arkansas Land and Farm Development Corp.

He graduated from Philander Smith College in 1975.

The agency collaborated with the Farmers Home Association to create the Outreach Training and Technical Assistance program.

Awards
1990 MacArthur Fellows Program
1990 National Partnership Award, by the United States Department of Agriculture
1989 Arkansas Public Service Award.

References

External links
"African-American Farmers: Working the Plough", Living on Earth, January 24, 1997

1953 births
Farmers from Arkansas
MacArthur Fellows
Philander Smith College alumni
Living people